The Ainu are the indigenous people of the lands surrounding the Sea of Okhotsk, including Hokkaido Island, Northeast Honshu Island, Sakhalin Island, the Kuril Islands, the Kamchatka Peninsula and Khabarovsk Krai, before the arrival of the Yamato Japanese and Russians.

Official estimates place the total Ainu population of Japan at 25,000. Unofficial estimates place the total population at 200,000 or higher, as the near-total assimilation of the Ainu into Japanese society has resulted in many individuals of Ainu descent having no knowledge of their ancestry. , the number of "pure" Ainu was estimated at about 300 people.

In 1966, there were about 300 native Ainu speakers; in 2008, however, there were about 100.

Names

Ainu also identify themselves as "Utari" ("comrade" or "people"). Official documents use both names.

History

Pre-modern 
The Ainu are the native people of Hokkaido, Sakhalin and the Kurils. Early Ainu-speaking groups (mostly hunters and fishermen) migrated also into the Kamchatka Peninsula and into Honshu, where their descendants are today known as the Matagi hunters, who still use a large amount of Ainu vocabulary in their dialect. Other evidence for Ainu-speaking hunters and fishermen migrating down from Northern Hokkaido into Honshu is through the Ainu toponyms which are found in several places of northern Honshu, mostly among the western coast and the Tōhoku region. Evidence for Ainu speakers in the Amur region is found through Ainu loanwords in the Uilta and Ulch people.

Research suggests that Ainu culture originated from a merger of the Okhotsk and Satsumon cultures. According to Lee and Hasegawa, the Ainu-speakers descend from the Okhotsk people who rapidly expanded from northern Hokkaido into the Kurils and Honshu. These early inhabitants did not speak the Japanese language; some were conquered by the Japanese early in the 9th century. In 1264, the Ainu invaded the land of the Nivkh people. The Ainu also started an expedition into the Amur region, which was then controlled by the Yuan Dynasty, resulting in reprisals by the Mongols who invaded Sakhalin. Active contact between the Wa-jin (the ethnically Japanese, also known as Yamato-jin) and the Ainu of Ezogashima (now known as Hokkaidō) began in the 13th century. The Ainu formed a society of hunter-gatherers, surviving mainly by hunting and fishing. They followed a religion which was based on natural phenomena.

During the Muromachi period (1336–1573), many Ainu were subject to Japanese rule. Disputes between the Japanese and Ainu developed into large-scale violence, Koshamain's Revolt, in 1456. Takeda Nobuhiro killed the Ainu leader, Koshamain.

The Ainu and Nivkh peoples of Sakhalin were subjugated and became tributaries to the Ming dynasty of China after Manchuria came under Ming rule as part of the Nurgan Regional Military Commission. Women in Sakhalin married Han Chinese Ming officials when the Ming took tribute from Sakhalin and the Amur river region. Due to Ming rule in Manchuria, Chinese cultural and religious influence such as Chinese New Year, the "Chinese god", Chinese motifs such as the dragon, spirals, scrolls, and material goods such as agriculture, husbandry, heating, iron cooking pots, silk and cotton spread among the Amur natives such as the Udeghes, Ulchis, and Nanais.

During the Edo period (1601–1868) the Ainu, who controlled the northern island which is now named Hokkaidō, became increasingly involved in trade with the Japanese who controlled the southern portion of the island. The Tokugawa bakufu (feudal government) granted the Matsumae clan exclusive rights to trade with the Ainu in the northern part of the island. Later, the Matsumae began to lease out trading rights to Japanese merchants, and contact between Japanese and Ainu became more extensive. Throughout this period Ainu groups competed with each other to import goods from the Japanese, and epidemic diseases such as smallpox reduced the population. Although the increased contact created by the trade between the Japanese and the Ainu contributed to increased mutual understanding, it also sometimes led to conflict which occasionally intensified into violent Ainu revolts. The most important was Shakushain's Revolt (1669–1672), an Ainu rebellion against Japanese authority. Another large-scale revolt by Ainu against Japanese rule was the Menashi-Kunashir Battle in 1789. However, throughout this period and thereafter the Ainu-Japanese relationship continued to be marked by trade and commercial relationships, not conflicts.

From 1799 to 1806, the shogunate took direct control of southern Hokkaidō. During this period, Ainu women were separated from their husbands and either subjected to rape or forcibly married to Japanese men, while Ainu men were deported to merchant subcontractors for five and ten-year terms of service. Policies of family separation and assimilation, combined with the impact of smallpox, caused the Ainu population to drop significantly in the early 19th century.

In the 18th century, there were 80,000 Ainu. In 1868, there were about 15,000 Ainu in Hokkaidō, 2000 in Sakhalin and around 100 in the Kuril islands.

The Santan Japanese traders, when they were trading in Sakhalin, seized Rishiri Ainu women to become their wives.

Japanese annexation of Hokkaido
In 1869, the imperial government established the Hokkaidō Development Commission as part of the measures of the Meiji Restoration. Sjöberg quotes Baba's (1890) account of the Japanese government's reasoning:

... The development of Japan's large northern island had several objectives: First, it was seen as a means to defend Japan from a rapidly developing and expansionist Russia. Second ... it offered a solution to the unemployment for the former samurai class ... Finally, development promised to yield the needed natural resources for a growing capitalist economy.

As a result of the Treaty of Saint Petersburg (1875), the Kuril Islands – along with their Ainu inhabitants – came under Japanese administration. In 1899, the Japanese government passed an act labelling the Ainu as "former aborigines", with the idea they would assimilate—this resulted in the Japanese government taking the land where the Ainu people lived and placing it from then on under Japanese control. Also at this time, the Ainu were granted automatic Japanese citizenship, effectively denying them the status of an indigenous group.

The Ainu went from being a relatively isolated group of people to having their land, language, religion and customs assimilated into those of the Japanese. Their land was distributed to the Yamato Japanese settlers and to create and maintain farms in the model of Western industrial agriculture. It was known as "colonization" (拓殖) at the time, but later by the euphemism "opening up undeveloped land" (開拓). As well as this, factories such as flour mills, beer breweries and mining practices resulted in the creation of infrastructure such as roads and railway lines, during a development period that lasted until 1904. During this time, the Ainu were ordered to cease religious practices such as animal sacrifice and the custom of tattooing. The same act applied to the native Ainu on Sakhalin after the Japanese annexation of it as the Karafuto Prefecture.

Assimilation after annexation
The Ainu have historically suffered from economic and social discrimination as the government as well as people in contact with the Ainu regarded them as dirty and primitive barbarians. The majority of Ainu were forced to be petty laborers during the Meiji Restoration, which saw the introduction of Hokkaidō into the Japanese Empire and the privatization of traditional Ainu lands. The Japanese government during the 19th and 20th centuries denied the rights of the Ainu to their traditional cultural practices, most notably the right to speak their language, as well as their right to hunt and gather.

This denial of Ainu cultural practices mostly stemmed from the 1899 Law for the Protection of Native Hokkaido Aborigines. This law and its associated policies were designed to fully integrate the Ainu into Japanese society with the cost of erasing Ainu culture and identity. The Ainu's position as manual laborers and their forced integration into larger Japanese society have led to discriminatory practices by the Japanese government that can still be felt today.
Intermarriage between Japanese and Ainu was actively promoted by the Ainu to lessen the chances of discrimination against their offspring. As a result, many Ainu are indistinguishable from their Japanese neighbors, but some Ainu-Japanese are interested in traditional Ainu culture. For example, Oki, born as a child of an Ainu father and a Japanese mother, became a musician who plays the traditional Ainu instrument . There are also many small towns in the southeastern or Hidaka region where ethnic Ainu live such as in Nibutani. Many live in Sambutsu especially, on the eastern coast.

Standard of living 
This discrimination and negative stereotypes assigned to the Ainu have manifested in the Ainu's lower levels of education, income levels and participation in the economy as compared to their ethnically Japanese counterparts. The Ainu community in Hokkaidō in 1993 received welfare payments at a 2.3 times higher rate, had an 8.9% lower enrollment rate from junior high school to high school and a 15.7% lower enrollment into college from high school than that of Hokkaidō as a whole. The Japanese government has been lobbied by activists to research the Ainu's standard of living nationwide due to this noticeable and growing gap. The Japanese government will provide ¥7 million (US$63,000) beginning in 2015, to conduct surveys nationwide on this matter.

The Ainu and Ethnic Homogeneity in Japan
The existence of the Ainu has challenged the notion of ethnic homogeneity in post-WWII Japan. After the demise of the multi-ethnic Empire of Japan in 1945, successive governments forged a single Japanese identity by advocating monoculturalism and denying the existence of more than one ethnic group in Japan.

Following the United Nations Declaration on the Rights of Indigenous Peoples in 2007, Hokkaido politicians pressured the government to recognize Ainu rights. Prime Minister Fukuda Yasuo answered a parliamentary question on May 20, 2008 by stating that "it is a historical fact that the Ainu are the precursors in the northern Japanese archipelago, in particular Hokkaido. The government acknowledges the Ainu to be an ethnic minority as it has maintained a unique cultural identity and having a unique language and religion." On June 6, 2008, the National Diet of Japan passed a non-binding, bipartisan resolution calling upon the government to recognize the Ainu as indigenous people.

In 2019, eleven years after this resolution, the Diet finally passed an act recognizing the Ainu to be an indigenous people of Japan. Despite this recognition of the Ainu as an ethnically distinct group, political figures in Japan continue to define ethnic homogeneity as key to overall Japanese national identity; Taro Aso, in 2020, notably claimed that “no other country but this one has lasted for as long as 2,000 years with one language, one ethnic group and one dynasty”.

Origins 

The Ainu have often been considered to descend from the diverse Jōmon people, who lived in northern Japan from the Jōmon period ( 14,000 to 300 BCE). One of their , or legends, tells that "[t]he Ainu lived in this place a hundred thousand years before the Children of the Sun came".

Recent research suggests that the historical Ainu culture originated from a merger of the Okhotsk culture with the Satsumon culture, cultures thought to have derived from the diverse Jōmon-period cultures of the Japanese archipelago.

The Ainu economy was based on farming, as well as on hunting, fishing and gathering.

According to Lee and Hasegawa of the Waseda University, the direct ancestors of the later Ainu people formed during the late Jōmon period from the combination of the local but diverse population of Hokkaido, long before the arrival of contemporary Japanese people. Lee and Hasegawa suggest that the Ainu language expanded from northern Hokkaido and may have originated from a relative more recent Northeast Asian/Okhotsk population, who established themselves in northern Hokkaido and had significant impact on the formation of Hokkaido's Jōmon culture.

The linguist and historian Joran Smale similarly found that the Ainu language likely originated from the ancient Okhotsk people, which had strong cultural influence on the "Epi-Jōmon" of southern Hokkaido and northern Honshu, but that the Ainu people themselves formed from the combination of both ancient groups. Additionally he notes that the historical distribution of Ainu dialects and its specific vocabulary correspond to the distribution of the maritime Okhotsk culture.

A 2021 study confirmed that the Hokkaido Jōmon population formed from "Terminal Upper-Paleolithic people" (TUP people) indigenous to Northern Eurasia and from proper Jōmon people, which arrived from Honshu about 15,000 BC. The Ainu in turn originated from the Hokkaido Epi-Jōmon and from the Okhotsk people in Hokkaido.

Another study in 2021 (Sato et al.) analyzed the indigenous populations of northern Japan and the Russian Far East. They concluded that Siberia and northern Japan was populated by two distinct waves:

Genetics

Paternal lineages 

Genetic testing has shown that the Ainu belong mainly to Y-DNA haplogroup D-M55 (D1a2) and C-M217. Y DNA haplogroup D M55 is found throughout the Japanese Archipelago, but with very high frequencies among the Ainu of Hokkaidō in the far north, and to a lesser extent among the Ryukyuans in the Ryukyu Islands of the far south. Recently it was confirmed that the Japanese branch of haplogroup D M55 is distinct and isolated from other D branches for more than 53,000 years.

Several studies (Hammer et al. 2006, Shinoda 2008, Matsumoto 2009, Cabrera et al. 2018) suggest that haplogroup D originated somewhere in Central Asia. According to Hammer et al., the ancestral haplogroup D originated between Tibet and the Altai mountains. He suggests that there were multiple waves into Eastern Eurasia.

A study by Tajima et al. (2004) suggest that fourteen out of sixteen Ainu (or 87.5%) belong to YAP+ lineages (Y-haplogroups D-M55* and D-M125), with 13/16 (81.3%) belonging to D-M55 and 1/16 (6.25%) belonging to D-M125 (the latter is much more typical of mainland Japanese males than Ainu). The presence of Haplogroup C M217 in the Ainu suggest a degree of genetic admixture with the Nivkhs. Hammer et al. (2006) found that one in a sample of four (or 25%) Ainu men belonged to haplogroup C M217.

Maternal lineages 
Based on analysis of one sample of 51 modern Ainu, their mtDNA lineages consist mainly of haplogroup Y [ = 21.6% according to Tanaka et al. 2004, or  = 19.6% according to Adachi et al. 2009, who have cited Tajima et al. 2004], haplogroup D [ = 17.6%, particularly D4 (xD1)], haplogroup M7a ( = 15.7%), and haplogroup G1 ( = 15.7%). Other mtDNA haplogroups detected in this sample include A, M7b2, N9b, B4f, F1b, and M9a. Most of the remaining individuals in this sample have been classified definitively only as belonging to macro-haplogroup M.

According to Sato et al. (2009), who have studied the mtDNA of the same sample of modern Ainus (=51), the major haplogroups of the Ainu are N9 [ = 27.5%, including  Y and  N9 (xY)], D [ = 23.5%, including  D (xD5) and  D5], M7 ( = 19.6%), and G ( = 19.6%, including  G1 and  G2); the minor haplogroups are A, B, F, and M (xM7, M8, CZ, D, G).

Studies published in 2004 and 2007 show the combined frequency of M7a and N9b were observed in Jōmons and which are believed by some to be Jōmon maternal contribution at 28% in Okinawans [ M7a1,  M7a (xM7a1),  N9b], 17.6% in Ainus [ M7a (xM7a1),  N9b], and from 10% [ M7a (xM7a1),  M7a1,  N9b] to 17% [ M7a1,  M7a (xM7a1)] in mainstream Japanese.

In addition, haplogroups D4, D5, M7b, M9a, M10, G, A, B, and F have been found in Jōmon people as well. These mtDNA haplogroups were found in various Jōmon samples and in some modern Japanese people.

A study by Kanazawa-Kiriyama in 2013 about mitochondrial haplogroups, found that the Ainu people (including samples from Hokkaido and Tōhoku) have a high frequency of N9b, which is also found among Udege people of eastern Siberia, and more common among Europeans than Eastern Asians, but absent from the geographically close Kantō Jōmon period samples, which have a higher frequency of M7a7, which is commonly found among East and Southeast Asians. According to the authors, these results add to the internal-diversity observed among the Jōmon period population and that a significant percentage of the Jōmon period people had ancestry from a Northeast Asian source population, suggested to be the source of the proto-Ainu language and culture, which is not detected in samples from Kantō.

A study by Adachi et al. 2018 concluded that: "Our results suggest that the Ainu were formed from the Hokkaido Jomon people, but subsequently underwent considerable admixture with adjacent populations. The present study strongly recommends revision of the widely accepted dual-structure model for the population history of the Japanese, in which the Ainu are assumed to be the direct descendants of the Jomon people."

Autosomal DNA 
A 2004 reevaluation of cranial traits suggests that the Ainu resemble the Okhotsk more than they do the Jōmon but there are large variations. This agrees with the references to the Ainu as a merger of Okhotsk and Satsumon referenced above. Similarly more recent studies link the Ainu to the local Hokkaido Jōmon period samples, such as the 3,800 year old Rebun sample.

Genetic analyses of HLA I and HLA II genes as well as HLA-A, -B, and -DRB1 gene frequencies links the Ainu to Indigenous peoples of the Americas. The genetics of a variety Asian groups show Ainu and of Native Americans are place relatively close can be traced back to Paleolithic groups in Siberia.

Hideo Matsumoto (2009) suggested, based on immunoglobulin analyses, that the Ainu (and Jōmon) have a Siberian origin. Compared with other East Asian populations, the Ainu have the highest amount of Siberian (immunoglobulin) components, higher than mainland Japanese people.

A 2012 genetic study has revealed that the closest genetic relatives of the Ainu are the Ryukyuan people, followed by the Yamato people and Nivkh.

A genetic analysis in 2016 showed that although the Ainu have some genetic relations to the Japanese people and Eastern Siberians (especially Itelmens and Chukchis), they are not directly related to any modern ethnic group. Further, the study detected genetic contribution from the Ainu to populations around the Sea of Okhotsk but no genetic influence on the Ainu themselves. According to the study, the Ainu-like genetic contribution in the Ulch people is about 17.8% or 13.5% and about 27.2% in the Nivkhs. The study also disproved the idea about a relation to Andamanese or Tibetans; instead, it presented evidence of gene flow between the Ainu and "lowland East Asian farmer populations" (represented in the study by the Ami and Atayal in Taiwan, and the Dai and Lahu in Mainland East Asia).

A genetic study in 2016 about historical Ainu samples from southern Sakhalin (8) and northern Hokkaido (4), found that these samples were closely related to the ancient Okhotsk people followed by Ainu samples from southern Hokkaido, pointing to some substructure among the ancient Ainu population.

Recent autosomal evidence suggests that the Ainu derive a majority of their ancestry from the local Jōmon period people of Hokkaido. A 2019 study by Gakuhari et al., analyzing ancient Jōmon remains, finds about 79.3% Hokkaido Jōmon ancestry in the Ainu. Another 2019 study (by Kanazawa-Kiriyama et al.) finds about 66% Hokkaido Jōmon ancestry. A genetic study in 2021 (Sato et al.) found that the Ainu probably derived about ~49% of their ancestry from the local Hokkaido Jōmon, ~22% from the Okhotsk (samplified by Chukotko-Kamchatkan peoples), and ~29% from the Yamato Japanese. Population genomic data from various Jōmon period samples show that their main ancestry component split from other East Asian people at about 15,000 BCE. Following their migration into the Japanese archipelago, they became largely isolated from outside geneflow. However geneflow from Ancient North Eurasians towards the Jōmon period population was detected along a North to South cline, with a peak among Hokkaido Jōmon.

Physical description

Physical differences could be observed between different Ainu subgroups and clans. According to anthropologists "…features considered to distinguish the Ainu from other populations in the area, especially the Japanese, are the tendency to dolichocephaly (long-headedness), a well developed glabella, a deeply depressed nose root, widely projecting cheekbones, a comparatively massive mandible (lower jaw), and an edge to edge bite", as well as more body and facial hair. Many Ainu men have abundant wavy hair and often wear long beards.

The book of Ainu Life and Legends by author Kyōsuke Kindaichi (published by the Japanese Tourist Board in 1942) contains a physical description of Ainu: 
Many have wavy hair, but some straight black hair. Very few of them have wavy brownish hair. Their skins are generally reported to be light brown. But this is due to the fact that they labor on the sea and in briny winds all day. Old people who have long desisted from their outdoor work are often found to be as white as western men. The Ainu have broad faces, beetling eyebrows, and sometimes large sunken eyes, which are generally horizontal and of the so-called European type. Eyes of the Mongolian type are rare but occasionally found among them.

A comparative study by Brace et al. (2001) argues for a closer morphological relation of the Ainu with prehistoric and living European groups, compared to with other East Asian groups. The authors concluded that part of their ancestors may have descended from a population (dubbed "Eurasians" by Brace et al.) that moved into northern Eurasia and eastwards in the Late Pleistocene, which significantly predates the expansion of the modern core population of East Asia from Mainland Southeast Asia.

Overall anthropometric characteristics and cranial features group the Ainu people most closely together with Native Americans, especially Eskimos, followed by other East Asians, rather than with Europeans.

A study by Kura et al. 2014 based on cranial and genetic characteristics suggests a mostly Northern Asian ("Arctic") origin for Ainu people. Thus, despite the Ainu sharing certain morphological similarities to Caucasoid populations, the Ainu are essentially of North Asiatic origin. Genetic evidence support a closer relation with Paleosiberian Arctic populations, such as the Chukchi people.

A study by Omoto has shown that the Ainu are more closely related to other East Asian groups (previously mentioned as 'Mongoloid') than to Western Eurasian groups (formerly termed as "Caucasian"), on the basis of fingerprints and dental morphology.

A study published in the scientific journal Journal of Human Genetics by Jinam et al. 2015, using genome-wide SNP data comparison, found that some Ainu carry two specific gene alleles, associated with facial features commonly found among Europeans, but generally absent among Japanese people and other East Asians.

Military service

Russo-Japanese War 
Ainu men were first recruited into the Japanese military in 1898. Sixty-four Ainu served in the Russo-Japanese War (1904–1905), eight of whom died in battle or from illness contracted during military service. Two received the Order of the Golden Kite, granted for bravery, leadership or command in battle.

Second World War 
During World War II, Australian troops engaged in the hard-fought Kokoda Track campaign (July–November 1942) in New Guinea, were surprised by the physique and fighting prowess of the first Japanese troops they encountered.

Language 

In 2008 Hohmann gave an estimate of fewer than 100 remaining speakers of the language; other research (Vovin 1993) placed the number at fewer than 15 speakers. Vovin has characterised the language as "almost extinct". As a result of this, the study of the Ainu language is limited and is based largely on historical research. Historically, the status of the Ainu language was rather high and was also used by early Russian and Japanese administrative officials to communicate with each other and with the indigenous people.

Despite the small number of native speakers of Ainu, there is an active movement to revitalize the language, mainly in Hokkaidō, but also elsewhere such as Kanto. Ainu oral literature has been documented both in hopes of safeguarding it for future generations, as well as using it as a teaching tool for language learners. 
As of 2011 there has been an increasing number of second-language learners, especially in Hokkaidō, in large part due to the pioneering efforts of the late Ainu folklorist, activist and former Diet member Shigeru Kayano, himself a native speaker, who first opened an Ainu language school in 1987 funded by Ainu Kyokai.

Although some researchers have attempted to show that the Ainu language and the Japanese language are related, modern scholars have rejected the idea that the relationship goes beyond contact (such as the mutual borrowing of words between Japanese and Ainu). No attempt to show a relationship with Ainu to any other language has gained wide acceptance, and linguists currently classify Ainu as a language isolate. Most Ainu people speak either the Japanese language or the Russian language.

Concepts expressed with prepositions (such as to, from, by, in, and at) in English appear as postpositional forms in Ainu (postpositions come after the word that they modify). A single sentence in Ainu can comprise many added or agglutinated sounds or affixes that represent nouns or ideas.

The Ainu language has had no indigenous system of writing, and has historically been transliterated using the Japanese kana or Russian Cyrillic.  it is typically written either in katakana or in the Latin alphabet.

Many of the Ainu dialects, even those from different extremities of Hokkaidō, were not mutually intelligible; however, all Ainu speakers understood the classic Ainu language of the Yukar, or epic stories. Without a writing system, the Ainu were masters of narration, with the Yukar and other forms of narration such as the Uepeker (Uwepeker) tales being committed to memory and related at gatherings which often lasted many hours or even days.

Culture 

Traditional Ainu culture was quite different from Japanese culture. According to Tanaka Sakurako from the University of British Columbia, the Ainu culture can be included into a wider "northern circumpacific region", referring to various indigenous cultures of Northeast Asia and "beyond the Bering Strait" in North America.

Never shaving after a certain age, the men had full beards and moustaches. Men and women alike cut their hair level with the shoulders at the sides of the head, trimmed semi-circularly behind. The women tattooed their mouths, and sometimes the forearms. The mouth tattoos were started at a young age with a small spot on the upper lip, gradually increasing with size. The soot deposited on a pot hung over a fire of birch bark was used for colour. Their traditional dress was a robe spun from the inner bark of the elm tree, called attusi or attush. Various styles were made, and consisted generally of a simple short robe with straight sleeves, which was folded around the body, and tied with a band about the waist. The sleeves ended at the wrist or forearm and the length generally was to the calves. Women also wore an undergarment of Japanese cloth.

Modern craftswomen weave and embroider traditional garments that command very high prices. In winter the skins of animals were worn, with leggings of deerskin and in Sakhalin, boots were made from the skin of dogs or salmon. Ainu culture considers earrings, traditionally made from grapevines, to be gender neutral. Women also wear a beaded necklace called a tamasay.

Their traditional cuisine consists of the meat of bear, fox, wolf, badger, ox, or horse, as well as fish, fowl, millet, vegetables, herbs, and roots. They never ate raw fish or meat; it was always boiled or roasted.

Their traditional habitations were reed-thatched huts, the largest  square, without partitions and having a fireplace in the center. There was no chimney, only a hole at the angle of the roof; there was one window on the eastern side and there were two doors. The house of the village head was used as a public meeting place when one was needed. Another kind of traditional Ainu house was called chise.

Instead of using furniture, they sat on the floor, which was covered with two layers of mats, one of rush, the other of a water plant with long sword shaped leaves (Iris pseudacorus); and for beds they spread planks, hanging mats around them on poles, and employing skins for coverlets. The men used chopsticks when eating; the women had wooden spoons. Ainu cuisine is not commonly eaten outside Ainu communities; only a few restaurants in Japan serve traditional Ainu dishes, mainly in Tokyo and Hokkaidō.

The functions of judgeship were not entrusted to chiefs; an indefinite number of a community's members sat in judgment upon its criminals. Capital punishment did not exist, nor did the community resort to imprisonment. Beating was considered a sufficient and final penalty. However, in the case of murder, the nose and ears of the culprit were cut off or the tendons of his feet severed.

Hunting 

The Ainu hunted from late autumn to early summer. The reasons for this were, among others, that in late autumn, plant gathering, salmon fishing and other activities of securing food came to an end, and hunters readily found game in fields and mountains in which plants had withered.

A village possessed a hunting ground of its own or several villages used a joint hunting territory (iwor). Heavy penalties were imposed on any outsiders trespassing on such hunting grounds or joint hunting territory.

The Ainu hunted Ussuri brown bears, Asian black bears, Ezo deer (a subspecies of sika deer), hares, red foxes, Japanese raccoon dogs, and other animals. Ezo deer were a particularly important food resource for the Ainu, as were salmon. They also hunted sea eagles such as white-tailed sea eagles, raven and other birds. The Ainu hunted eagles to obtain their tail feathers, which they used in trade with the Japanese.

The Ainu hunted with arrows and spears with poison-coated points. They obtained the poison, called surku, from the roots and stalks of aconites. The recipe for this poison was a household secret that differed from family to family. They enhanced the poison with mixtures of roots and stalks of dog's bane, boiled juice of Mekuragumo (a type of harvestman), Matsumomushi (Notonecta triguttata, a species of backswimmer), tobacco and other ingredients. They also used stingray stingers or skin covering stingers.

They hunted in groups with dogs. Before the Ainu went hunting, particularly for bear and similar animals, they prayed to the god of fire, the house guardian god, to convey their wishes for a large catch, and to the god of mountains for safe hunting.

The Ainu usually hunted bear during the spring thaw. At that time, bears were weak because they had not fed at all during their long hibernation. Ainu hunters caught hibernating bears or bears that had just left hibernation dens. When they hunted bear in summer, they used a spring trap loaded with an arrow, called an amappo. The Ainu usually used arrows to hunt deer. Also, they drove deer into a river or sea and shot them with arrows. For a large catch, a whole village would drive a herd of deer off a cliff and club them to death.

Fishing 

Fishing was important for the Ainu. They largely caught trout, primarily in summer, and salmon in autumn, as well as "ito" (Japanese huchen), dace and other fish. Spears called "marek" were often used. Other methods were "tesh" fishing, "uray" fishing and "rawomap" fishing. Many villages were built near rivers or along the coast. Each village or individual had a definite river fishing territory. Outsiders could not freely fish there and needed to ask the owner.

Ornaments 
Men wore a crown called sapanpe for important ceremonies. Sapanpe was made from wood fibre with bundles of partially shaved wood. This crown had wooden figures of animal gods and other ornaments on its centre. Men carried an emush (ceremonial sword) secured by an emush at strap to their shoulders.

Women wore matanpushi, embroidered headbands, and ninkari, earrings. Ninkari was a metal ring with a ball. Matanpushi and ninkari were originally worn by men. Furthermore, aprons called maidari now are a part of women's formal clothes. However, some old documents say that men wore maidari. Women sometimes wore a bracelet called tekunkani.

Women wore a necklace called rektunpe, a long, narrow strip of cloth with metal plaques. They wore a necklace that reached the breast called a tamasay or shitoki, usually made from glass balls. Some glass balls came from trade with the Asian continent. The Ainu also obtained glass balls secretly made by the Matsumae clan.

Housing 

A village is called a kotan in the Ainu language. Kotan were located in river basins and seashores where food was readily available, particularly in the basins of rivers through which salmon went upstream. In the early modern times, the Ainu people were forced to labor at the fishing grounds of the Japanese. Ainu kotan were also forced to move near fishing grounds so that the Japanese could secure a labor force. When the Japanese moved to other fishing grounds, Ainu kotan were also forced to accompany them. As a result, the traditional kotan disappeared and large villages of several dozen families were formed around the fishing grounds.

Cise or cisey (houses) in a kotan were made of cogon grass, bamboo grass, bark, etc. The length lay east to west or parallel to a river. A house was about seven meters by five with an entrance at the west end that also served as a storeroom. The house had three windows, including the "rorun-puyar," a window located on the side facing the entrance (at the east side), through which gods entered and left and ceremonial tools were taken in and out. The Ainu have regarded this window as sacred and have been told never to look in through it. A house had a fireplace near the entrance. The husband and wife sat on the fireplace's left side (called shiso) . Children and guests sat facing them on the fireplace's right side (called harkiso). The house had a platform for valuables called iyoykir behind the shiso. The Ainu placed sintoko (hokai) and ikayop (quivers) there.

Traditions 

The Ainu people had various types of marriage. A child was promised in marriage by arrangement between his or her parents and the parents of his or her betrothed or by a go-between. When the betrothed reached a marriageable age, they were told who their spouse was to be. There were also marriages based on mutual consent of both sexes. In some areas, when a daughter reached a marriageable age, her parents let her live in a small room called tunpu annexed to the southern wall of her house. The parents chose her spouse from men who visited her.

The age of marriage was 17 to 18 years of age for men and 15 to 16 years of age for women, who were tattooed. At these ages, both sexes were regarded as adults.

When a man proposed to a woman, he visited her house, ate half a full bowl of rice handed to him by her, and returned the rest to her. If the woman ate the rest, she accepted his proposal. If she did not and put it beside her, she rejected his proposal. When a man became engaged to a woman or they learned that their engagement had been arranged, they exchanged gifts. He sent her a small engraved knife, a workbox, a spool, and other gifts. She sent him embroidered clothes, coverings for the back of the hand, leggings and other handmade clothes.

The worn-out fabric of old clothing was used for baby clothes because soft cloth was good for the skin of babies and worn-out material protected babies from gods of illness and demons due to these gods' abhorrence of dirty things. Before a baby was breast-fed, they were given a decoction of the endodermis of alder and the roots of butterburs to discharge impurities. Children were raised almost naked until about the ages of four to five. Even when they wore clothes, they did not wear belts and left the front of their clothes open. Subsequently, they wore bark clothes without patterns, such as attush, until coming of age.

Newborn babies were named ayay (a baby's crying), shipo, poyshi (small excrement), and shion (old excrement). Children were called by these "temporary" names until the ages of two to three. They were not given permanent names when they were born. Their tentative names had a portion meaning "excrement" or "old things" to ward off the demon of ill-health. Some children were named based on their behaviour or habits. Other children were named after impressive events or after parents' wishes for the future of the children. When children were named, they were never given the same names as others.

Men wore loincloths and had their hair dressed properly for the first time at age 15–16. Women were also considered adults at the age of 15–16. They wore underclothes called mour and had their hair dressed properly and wound waistcloths called raunkut and ponkut around their bodies. When women reached age 12–13, the lips, hands and arms were tattooed. When they reached age 15–16, their tattoos were completed. Thus were they qualified for marriage.

Religion 

The Ainu have no priests by profession; instead the village chief performs whatever religious ceremonies are necessary.

They are placed on an altar used to "send back" the spirits of killed animals. Ainu ceremonies for sending back bears are called . The Ainu people give thanks to the gods before eating and pray to the deity of fire in time of sickness.

The Ainu are part of a larger collective of indigenous people who practice "arctolatry" or bear worship. The Ainu believe that the bear holds particular importance as 's chosen method of delivering the gift of the bear's hide and meat to humans.

John Batchelor reported that the Ainu view the world as being a spherical ocean on which float many islands, a view based on the fact that the sun rises in the east and sets in the west. He wrote that they believe the world rests on the back of a large fish, which when it moves causes earthquakes.

Ainu assimilated into mainstream Japanese society have adopted Buddhism and Shintō, while some northern Ainu were converted as members of the Russian Orthodox Church. There have also been reports that the Russian Orthodox Church has performed some missionary projects in the Sakhalin Ainu community. However, not many people have converted and there are only reports of several persons who have converted. Even so, the reports indicate that many Ainu have kept their faith in the deities of ancient times.

According to a 2012 survey conducted by Hokkaidō University, a high percentage of Ainu are members of their household family religion which is Buddhism (especially  Buddhism). However, it is pointed out that similar to the Japanese religious consciousness, there is not a strong feeling of identification with a particular religion, with Buddhist and traditional beliefs being part of their daily life culture.

Rituals 
Ainu religion consists of a pantheistic animist structure, in which the world is founded on interactions between humans and Kamuy. Within all living beings, natural forces, and objects is a Ramat (sacred life force) that is an extension of a greater Kamuy. Kamuy are gods or spirits that choose to visit the human world in a temporary physical form, both animate and inanimate, within the human world. Once the physical vessel dies or breaks, the Ramat returns to the Kamuy and leaves its physical form behind as a gift to the humans. If the humans treated the vessel and Kamuy with respect and gratitude, then the Kamuy would return out of delight for the human world. Due to this interaction, the Ainu lived with deep reverence for nature and all objects and phenomena in hopes that the Kamuy would return. The Ainu believed that the Kamuy bestowed objects, skills, and knowledge to utilize tools on to humans, and thus deserve respect and worship. Daily practices included the moderation of hunting, gathering, and harvesting to not disturb the Kamuy. Often, the Ainu would make offerings of an Inau (sacred shaved stick), which usually consisted of a whittled willow tree wood with decorative shavings still attached, and wine to the Kamuy. Furthermore, sacred altars called Nusa (fence-like row of taller Inau decorated with bear skulls) separated from the main house and raised storehouses and often observed outdoor rituals.

The Ainu people had a ritual that would return Kamuy, a divine or spiritual being in Ainu mythology, to the spiritual realm. This Kamuy sending ritual was called Omante, a bear cub would be captured alive during hibernation, and raised in the village as a child. Women would care for the bear cubs as if they were their children, sometimes even nursing them if needed. Once the bears reached maturity they would hold another ritual every 5 to 10 years called Lomante (sometimes Lyomante). People from neighboring villages were invited to help celebrate this ritual, where members of the village would send the bear back to the realm of spirits by gathering around the bear in a central area and using special ceremonial arrows to shoot at the bear. Afterwards they would eat the meat. However, in 1955 this ritual was legally abolished for animal cruelty. In 2007 this ritual became exempt due to its cultural importance to The Ainu people. This ritual has since been modified, it is now an annual festival. This festival begins at sundown with a torch parade, a play is then performed, and is followed by music and dancing.

More rituals that were performed were for things like food and illness. The Ainu had a ritual to welcome the salmon, praying for a big catch, as well as a ritual to thank the salmon at the end of the season. The ritual for warding off Kamuy that would bring epidemics, using strong-smelling herbs placed in doorways, windows, and gardens in order to turn away epidemic Kamuy. Similarly to many religions, the Ainu also gave prayers and offerings to their ancestors in the spirit world or afterlife. Prayers would be to the fire Kamuy to deliver their offerings of broken snacks and fruit as well as tobacco(Ainu, Everyculture).

Dancing in Rituals 
Traditional dances are performed at ceremonies, banquets, it's a part of the newly organized cultural festivals, and is even done privately in daily life. Ainu traditional dances often involve large circles of dancers, and sometimes there are onlookers that sing without musical instruments. In rituals these dances are intimate, they involve the calls and movements of animals and/or insects. Some, like the sword and bow dances, are rituals, and these were used as a way to worship and give thanks for nature. This was to thank deities that they believed were in their surroundings. In Lomante, there was also a dance, this dance mimicked the movements of a living bear. However, some dances are improvised and meant just for entertainment. Overall Ainu traditional dancing reinforced their connection to mature, the religious world, and provided a link to other arctic cultures.

Funerals 
Funerals included prayers & offerings to the fire kamuy, as well as verse laments expressing wishes for a smooth journey to next world. The items that were to be buried with the dead were first broken or cracked to allow spirits to be released and travel to the afterlife together. Sometimes after a burial if would be followed by burning the residence of the dead. In the event of an unnatural death, there would be a speech raging against the gods.

In the afterlife, recognized ancestral spirits moved through and influenced the world, though neglected spirits would return to the living world and cause misfortune. Prosperity of family in the afterlife would be depend on prayers and offerings left by living descendants, so it often led to Ainu parents teaching their children to look after them in the afterlife (Ainu, Everyculture).

Institutions 

Most Hokkaidō Ainu and some other Ainu are members of an umbrella group called the Hokkaidō Utari Association. It was originally controlled by the government to speed Ainu assimilation and integration into the Japanese nation-state. It now is run exclusively by Ainu and operates mostly independently of the government.

Other key institutions include The Foundation for Research and Promotion of Ainu Culture (FRPAC), set up by the Japanese government after enactment of the Ainu Culture Law in 1997, the Hokkaidō University Center for Ainu and Indigenous Studies established in 2007, as well as museums and cultural centers. Ainu people living in Tokyo have also developed a vibrant political and cultural community.

Since late 2011, the Ainu have cultural exchange and cultural cooperation with the Sámi people of northern Europe. Both the Sámi and the Ainu participate in the organization for Arctic indigenous peoples and the Sámi research office in Lapland (Finland).

Currently, there are several Ainu museums and cultural parks. The most famous are:

 National Ainu Museum
 Kawamura Kaneto Ainu museum
 Ainu Kotan
 Ainu folklore museum
 Hokkaido Museum of Northern Peoples

Ethnic rights

Legal action 
On 27 March 1997, the Sapporo District Court decided a landmark case that, for the first time in Japanese history, recognized the right of the Ainu people to enjoy their distinct culture and traditions. The case arose because of a 1978 government plan to build two dams in the Saru River watershed in southern Hokkaidō. The dams were part of a series of development projects under the Second National Development Plan that were intended to industrialize the north of Japan. The planned location for one of the dams was across the valley floor close to Nibutani village, the home of a large community of Ainu people and an important center of Ainu culture and history. In the early 1980s when the government commenced construction on the dam, two Ainu landowners refused to agree to the expropriation of their land. These landowners were Kaizawa Tadashi and Kayano Shigeru—well-known and important leaders in the Ainu community. After Kaizawa and Kayano declined to sell their land, the Hokkaidō Development Bureau applied for and was subsequently granted a Project Authorization, which required the men to vacate their land. When their appeal of the Authorization was denied, Kayano and Kaizawa's son Koichii (Kaizawa died in 1992), filed suit against the Hokkaidō Development Bureau.

The final decision denied the relief sought by the plaintiffs for pragmatic reasons, the dam was already standing, but the decision was nonetheless heralded as a landmark victory for the Ainu people. In short, nearly all of the plaintiffs' claims were recognized. Moreover, the decision marked the first time Japanese case law acknowledged the Ainu as an indigenous people and contemplated the responsibility of the Japanese nation to the indigenous people within its borders. The decision included broad fact-finding that underscored the long history of the oppression of the Ainu people by Japan's majority, referred to as Wa-Jin in the case and discussions about the case. The decision was issued on March 27, 1997, and because of the broad implications for Ainu rights, the plaintiffs decided not to appeal the decision, which became final two weeks later. After the decision was issued, on 8 May 1997, the Diet passed the Ainu Culture Law and repealed the Ainu Protection Act—the 1899 law that had been the vehicle of Ainu oppression for almost one hundred years. While the Ainu Culture Law has been widely criticized for its shortcomings, the shift that it represents in Japan's view of the Ainu people is a testament to the importance of the Nibutani decision. In 2007 the 'Cultural Landscape along the Sarugawa River resulting from Ainu Tradition and Modern Settlement' was designated an Important Cultural Landscape of Japan. A later action seeking restoration of Ainu assets held in trust by the Japanese Government was dismissed in 2008.

Governmental bodies on Ainu affairs
There is no single government body to coordinate Ainu affairs, rather, various advisory boards are set up by the Hokkaido government to advise specific matters. This panel's circumstances were criticized for including not even a single Ainu person among its members.

More recently, a panel was established in 2006, which notably was the first time an Ainu person was included. It completed its work in 2008 issuing a major report that included an extensive historical record and called for substantial government policy changes towards the Ainu.

Formation of Ainu political party 
The  was founded on 21 January 2012, after a group of Ainu activists in Hokkaidō announced the formation of a political party for the Ainu on 30 October 2011. The Ainu Association of Hokkaidō reported that Kayano Shiro, the son of the former Ainu leader Kayano Shigeru, will head the party. Their aim is to contribute to the realization of a multicultural and multiethnic society in Japan, along with rights for the Ainu.

Official promotion

Japan

The 2019 Ainu act simplified procedures for getting various permissions from authorities in regards to the traditional lifestyle of the Ainu and nurture the identity and cultures of the Ainu without defining the ethnic group by blood lineage.

The National Ainu Museum was opened on 12 July 2020. The museum had been scheduled to open on 24 April 2020, prior to the Tokyo Olympic and Paralympic Games scheduled in the same year, in Shiraoi, Hokkaidō. The park will be a base for the protection and promotion of Ainu people, culture and language. The museum promotes the culture and habits of the Ainu people who are the original inhabitants of Hokkaidō. Upopoy in Ainu language means "singing in a large group". The National Ainu Museum building has images and videos exhibiting the history and daily life of the Ainu.

Russia 

As a result of the Treaty of Saint Petersburg (1875), the Kuril Islands – along with their Ainu inhabitants – came under Japanese administration. A total of 83 North Kuril Ainu arrived in Petropavlovsk-Kamchatsky on September 18, 1877, after they decided to remain under Russian rule. They refused the offer by Russian officials to move to new reservations in the Commander Islands. Finally a deal was reached in 1881 and the Ainu decided to settle in the village of Yavin. In March 1881, the group left Petropavlovsk and started the journey towards Yavin on foot. Four months later they arrived at their new homes. Another village, Golygino, was founded later. Under Soviet rule, both the villages were forced to disband and residents were moved to the Russian-dominated Zaporozhye rural settlement in Ust-Bolsheretsky Raion. As a result of intermarriage, the three ethnic groups assimilated to form the Kamchadal community. In 1953, K. Omelchenko, the minister for the protection of military and state secrets in the USSR, banned the press from publishing any more information on the Ainu living in the USSR. This order was revoked after two decades.

, the North Kuril Ainu of Zaporozhye form the largest Ainu subgroup in Russia. The Nakamura clan (South Kuril Ainu on their paternal side), the smallest group, numbers just six people residing in Petropavlovsk. On Sakhalin island, a few dozen people identify themselves as Sakhalin Ainu, but many more with partial Ainu ancestry do not acknowledge it. Most of the 888 Japanese people living in Russia (2010 Census) are of mixed Japanese–Ainu ancestry, although they do not acknowledge it (full Japanese ancestry gives them the right of visa-free entry to Japan.) Similarly, no one identifies themselves as Amur Valley Ainu, although people with partial descent live in Khabarovsk. There is no evidence of living descendants of the Kamchatka Ainu.

In the 2010 Census of Russia, close to 100 people tried to register themselves as ethnic Ainu in the village, but the governing council of Kamchatka Krai rejected their claim and enrolled them as ethnic Kamchadal. In 2011, the leader of the Ainu community in Kamchatka, Alexei Vladimirovich Nakamura, requested that Vladimir Ilyukhin (Governor of Kamchatka) and Boris Nevzorov (Chairman of the State Duma) include the Ainu in the central list of the Indigenous small-numbered peoples of the North, Siberia and the Far East. This request was also turned down.

Ethnic Ainu living in Sakhalin Oblast and Khabarovsk Krai are not organized politically. According to Alexei Nakamura,  only 205 Ainu live in Russia (up from just 12 people who self-identified as Ainu in 2008) and they along with the Kurile Kamchadals (Itelmen of Kuril islands) are fighting for official recognition. Since the Ainu are not recognized in the official list of the peoples living in Russia, they are counted as people without nationality or as ethnic Russians or Kamchadal.

The Ainu have emphasized that they were the natives of the Kuril islands and that the Japanese and Russians were both invaders. In 2004, the small Ainu community living in Russia in Kamchatka Krai wrote a letter to Vladimir Putin, urging him to reconsider any move to award the Southern Kuril Islands to Japan. In the letter they blamed the Japanese, the Tsarist Russians and the Soviets for crimes against the Ainu such as killings and assimilation, and also urged him to recognize the Japanese genocide against the Ainu people—which was turned down by Putin.

 both the Kuril Ainu and Kuril Kamchadal ethnic groups lack the fishing and hunting rights which the Russian government grants to the indigenous tribal communities of the far north.

In March 2017, Alexei Nakamura revealed that plans for an Ainu village to be created in Petropavlovsk-Kamchatsky and plans for an Ainu dictionary are underway.

Geography 

The traditional locations of the Ainu are Hokkaido, Sakhalin, the Kuril Islands, Kamchatka, and the northern Tohoku region. Many of the place names that remain in Hokkaido and the Kuril Islands have a phonetic equivalent of the Ainu place names.

In 1756 CE, Mitsugu Nyui was a kanjō-bugyō (a high-ranking Edo period official responsible for finance) of the Hirosaki Domain in the Tsugaru Peninsula. He implemented an assimilation policy for Ainu who were engaged in fishing in the Tsugaru Peninsula. Since then, Ainu culture was rapidly lost from Honshu.

After the Treaty of Saint Petersburg (1875), most of the Ainu from the Kuril islands were moved to the island Shikotan by persuading the pioneers for difficult life supplies and for defense purposes (Kurishima Cruise Diary).

In 1945, the Soviet Union invaded Japan and occupied Sakhalin and the Kuril Islands. The Ainu who lived there were repatriated to their home country, Japan, except for those who indicated their willingness to remain.

Population 

The population of the Ainu during the Edo period was a maximum of 26,800, but it has declined due to the epidemic of infectious diseases since it was regarded as a Tenryō territory.

According to the 1897 Russian census, 1,446 Ainu native speakers lived in Russian territory.

Currently, there are no Ainu items in the Japanese national census, and no fact-finding has been conducted at national institutions. Therefore, the exact number of Ainu people is unknown. However, multiple surveys were conducted that provide an indication of the total population.

According to a 2006 Hokkaido Agency survey, there were 23,782 Ainu people in Hokkaido. When viewed by the branch office (currently the Promotion Bureau), there are many in the Iburi / Hidaka branch office. In addition, the definition of "Ainu" by the Hokkaido Agency in this survey is "a person who seems to have inherited the blood of Ainu" or "the same livelihood as those with marriage or adoption." Additionally, if it is denied that the other person is an Ainu then it is not subject to investigation.

According to a 1971 survey, there were 77,000 survey results. There is also a survey that the total number of Ainu living in Japan is 200,000. However, there's no other survey that supports this estimate.

Many Ainu live outside Hokkaido. A 1988 survey estimated that the population of Ainu living in Tokyo was 2,700. According to a 1989 survey report on Utari living in Tokyo, it is estimated that the area around Tokyo alone exceeds 10% of Ainu living in Hokkaido, and there are more than 10,000 Ainu living in the Tokyo metropolitan area.

In addition to Japan and Russia, it was reported in 1992 that there was a descendant of Kuril Ainu in Poland, but there are also indications that it is a descendant of the Aleut. On the other hand, the descendant of the children born in Poland by the Polish anthropologist Bronisław Piłsudski, who was the leading Ainu researcher and left a vast amount of research material such as photographs and wax tubes, was born in Japan.

According to a 2017 survey, the Ainu population in Hokkaido is about 13,000. This has dropped sharply from 24,000 in 2006, but this is because the number of members of the Ainu Association of Hokkaido, which is cooperating with the survey, has decreased, and interest in protecting personal information has increased. It is thought that the number of people who cooperated is decreasing, and that it does not match the actual number of people.

Subgroups 
These are unofficial sub groups of the Ainu people with location and population estimates.

In popular culture 

 The characters Nakoruru, Rimururu, and Rera from the SNK game series Samurai Shodown are Ainu.
 The manga and anime series Golden Kamuy has an Ainu girl, Asirpa, as one of the protagonists, and features many aspects of Ainu culture.
 The character Fredzilla from Big Hero 6 is of Ainu descent.
 The character Okuru from the anime series Samurai Champloo is the sole survivor of an Ainu village wiped out by disease.
 Usui Horokeu, also known as Horohoro, from the manga series Shaman King is a member of an Ainu tribe.
 "Ainu" is a playable nation in the game Europa Universalis IV.
 The history of the island of Hokkaido, and of the Ainu people, are part of the plot of a chapter in the manga Silver Spoon.
 A coming-of-age film, Ainu Mosir, was released in Japan on 17 October 2020. The film portrays Kanto, a sensitive 14-year-old Ainu boy who struggled to come to terms with his father's death and his identity. The film also focuses on the dilemma of controversial bear sacrifice under the shadow of the modern Japanese society and the Ainu's heavy reliance on tourists for their livelihood. Along with other restless teenagers, Kanto is under pressure to retain their Ainu identity and participate in the cultural rituals.
 In the James Bond novel You Only Live Twice and film, Bond's character spends some time living in an Ainu village and (in the film) is supposedly disguised as one of the local people, "marrying" a local pearl fisher as part of his cover.

See also 

 Ainu-ken
 Akira Ifukube
 Bibliography of the Ainu
 Bikki Sunazawa
 Constitution of Japan
 Declaration on the Rights of Indigenous Peoples
 Emishi
 Aterui
 Ethnocide
 Genocide of indigenous peoples
 Hiram M. Hiller Jr.
 Indigenous peoples
 Kankō Ainu
 Takashi Ukaji
 Shigeru Kayano
 Nibutani Dam

Ainu culture 
 Ainu music
 Ainu flag
 Ainu genre painting
 Ikupasuy
 Iomante
 Matagi
 Yukar

Ethnic groups in Japan 
 Ethnic issues in Japan
 Human rights in Japan
 Ryukyuan people
 Ryūkyū independence movement
 Nivkhs

References

Citations

Sources 
 Japan Times. Ainu Plan Group for Upper House Run, October 31, 2011

Further reading 

 
 
 
 
 
 
 Hitchingham, Masako Yoshida (trans.), Act for the Promotion of Ainu Culture & Dissemination of Knowledge Regarding Ainu Traditions, Asian-Pacific Law & Policy Journal, vol. 1, no. 1 (2000).
 Kayano, Shigeru (1994). Our Land Was A Forest: An Ainu Memoir. Westview Press. . .
 
 
 
 
 
 (Harvard University)(Digitized January 24, 2006)
 
 
 (Indiana University) (digitized September 3, 2009)
  [Original from Harvard University Digitized Jan 30, 2008] [YOKOHAMA : R. MEIKLEJOHN & CO., NO 49.]

The Collected Works of Bronisław Piłsudski, translated and edited by Alfred F. Majewicz with the assistance of Elzbieta Majewicz. 
 Volume 1: The Aborigines of Sakhalin
 Volume 2: Materials for the Study of the Ainu Language and Folklore (Kraków 1912)
 Volume 3: Materials for the Study of the Ainu Language and Folklore II
 Volumn 4: Materials for the Study of Tungusic Languages and Folklore

External links 

 Organizations
 Hokkaido Utari Kyokai/Ainu Association of Hokkaido 
 Sapporo Pirka Kotan Ainu Cultural Center
 Foundation for Research and Promotion of Ainu Culture (centers located in Sapporo and Tokyo) 
 Hokkaido University Center for Ainu and Indigenous Studies
 Institute for the Study of Languages and Cultures of Ainu in Samani, Hokkaidō
 Foundation for Ainu Culture 

 Museums and exhibits
 Smithsonian Institution
 The Boone Collection
 Nibutani Ainu Cultural Museum 
 The Ainu Museum at Shiraoi
 Ainu Komonjo (18th & 19th century records) – Ohnuki Collection
 The Regions: North America—Ainu–North American cultural similarities

 Articles
 "Japan's Ainu hope new identity leads to more rights" in The Christian Science Monitor, June 9, 2008
 A Salmon's Life: An Incredible Journey (Columbia River basin, June 8, 2016)—Posterback Activities

 Video
 "A Trip through Japan with the YWCA (ca. 1919)"—Rare Japanese video featuring Ainu
 The Ainu: The First Peoples of Japan. Old videos and photographs arranged by Rawn Joseph
 "The Despised Ainu People". The Ainus' Tense Relationship with Japan. 1994. Journeyman.tv

 
 
Ethnic groups in Japan
Ethnic groups in Russia
History of Hokkaido
History of Northeast Asia
History of Sakhalin
Indigenous peoples of East Asia
People of Kamakura-period Japan
Russian people of Japanese descent
Genocides in Asia